Simon Green may refer to:

 Simon Green (bowls) (born 1983), English bowls champion
 Simon Green (cricketer) (born 1970), former English cricketer
 Simon F. Green,  astronomer who specializes in asteroids, trans-Neptunian objects and the IRAS satellite 
 Simon R. Green (born 1955), British science-fiction and fantasy author

 Simon Green, the real name of Bonobo (musician)